John Joseph Murphy (December 7, 1930 – March 23, 1970) was a Canadian professional wrestler better known by his ring name Skull Murphy. He began his career wrestling in Canada and later worked at Jim Crockett Promotions and Georgia Championship Wrestling in the United States. In the 1960s, he teamed with Brute Bernard in the World Wide Wrestling Federation and won championships in several professional wrestling promotions. In his later career, he worked primarily in Australia.

Early life
Murphy grew up in Hamilton, Ontario. As a child, he developed a disease that prevented him from growing any hair on his body. He attended Hamilton Central Technical School, where he met professional wrestler Chuck Molnar. Molnar convinced Murphy to become a wrestler, and Murphy began training at the Hamilton Jewish YMCA under Jimmy Simms. Author Mordecai Richler states that Murphy told him that he rubbed baby oil on his bald head before matches to reduce irritation from the ring floor.

Career

Early career (1952-1961)
Murphy began competing in 1952. He wrestled in Welland, Ontario as well as Larry Kasaboski's Northland Wrestling Enterprises in northeastern Ontario. He soon began competing for promotions on the east coast of the United States, including Jim Crockett Promotions. He was billed as living in Ireland. By 1959, he was competing for Georgia Championship Wrestling (GCW), where he feuded with Dickie Gunkel. Professional boxer Joey Maxim was the referee for one match between Murphy and Gunkel. After Gunkel won, Murphy challenged Maxim to a "wrestler vs. boxer" match the following week, which Murphy won. He competed in GCW for several years and won five championships in 1961, which included three reigns with the Georgia version of the NWA Southern Heavyweight Championship. He also formed a tag team with Gypsy Joe and won both the NWA International Tag Team Championship and the NWA Southern Tag Team Championship.

Teaming with Brute Bernard (1961-1965)
Murphy was paired with Brute Bernard, a fellow Canadian. They competed together in the World Wide Wrestling Federation (WWWF), where they won the WWWF United States Tag Team Championship on May 16, 1963. They also wrestled for Championship Wrestling from Florida and won the Florida version of the NWA World Tag Team Championship on two occasions. In addition to competing in the United States, Murphy and Bernard were successful in Australia. They won the IWA World Tag Team Championship twice in 1966 while competing for the Australian World Championship Wrestling.

Australia and reunion with Bernard (1965-1970)
Murphy remained in Australia while Bernard returned to the United States. Murphy never won a title belt in the United States again, but he held several championships in Australia as both a singles wrestler and tag team competitor. Over the next two years, he had two reigns as the IWA World Heavyweight Champion. He also formed a tag team with Killer Kowalski and won the IWA World Tag Team Championship twice more, defeating Red Bastien and Mario Milano for the title both times. He then reunited with Bernard to hold the IWA tag team belts again. The team returned to the United States, where they worked in Jim Crockett Promotions. While there, they wrestled as heels (villains) against other heel teams in an unusual series of matches. These "Battle of the Bullies" matches pitted them against such teams as the pairing of Swede Hanson and Rip Hawk or the Anderson Brothers (Gene and Ole).

The majority of Murphy's remaining career, however, was spent in Australia. In 1968, he had two more reigns as IWA World Tag Team Champion, pairing with Killer Karl Kox and Toru Tanaka. He also held the IWA World Heavyweight Championship again after winning the belt on November 18, 1968. Competing in Japan for All Japan Pro Wrestling, he teamed with Klondike Bill to win the All Asia Tag Team Championship. His final title came on December 5, 1969, when he reunited with Bernard once again to win his final IWA World Tag Team Championship.

Death

On March 23, 1970, Murphy and Bernard were scheduled to face The Kentuckian and Mr. Wrestling. Before the event, his wife found him dead in their apartment, having overdosed on sleeping pills in an apparent suicide.

Legacy
Another wrestler billed as Skull Murphy wrestled for the Memphis-based Continental Wrestling Association, where he won the AWA Southern Tag Team Championship three times with Gypsy Joe Dorsetti in 1980, managed by Jimmy Hart.

British wrestler Peter Northey (the son of wrestler Charles "Roy Bull Davies" Northey) also adopted the "Skull Murphy" name along with a shaven-headed image.  This version of Murphy  won the 1984 Grand Prix belt tournament on television and later held the British Light Heavyweight Championship in 1995, and also formed the Riot Squad tag team with Fit Finlay, together winning the 1982 World of Sport Top Tag Team Tournament.

Championships and accomplishments
Japan Pro Wrestling Alliance
All Asia Tag Team Championship (1 time) - with Klondike Bill
Championship Wrestling from Florida
NWA World Tag Team Championship (Florida version) (2 times) - with Brute Bernard
Georgia Championship Wrestling
NWA International Tag Team Championship (Georgia version) (1 time) - with Gypsy Joe
NWA Southern Heavyweight Championship (Georgia version) (3 times)
NWA Southern Tag Team Championship (Georgia version) (1 time) – with Gypsy Joe
World Championship Wrestling (Australia)
IWA World Heavyweight Championship (3 times)
IWA World Tag Team Championship (9 times) - with Brute Bernard (5), Killer Kowalski (2), Killer Karl Kox (1), and Toru Tanaka (1)
World Wide Wrestling Federation
WWWF United States Tag Team Championship (1 time) - with Brute Bernard

See also
 List of premature professional wrestling deaths

References

External links
 Profile at Online World of Wrestling

1930 births
1970 suicides
20th-century professional wrestlers
Canadian male professional wrestlers
Professional wrestlers from Hamilton, Ontario
Stampede Wrestling alumni
Drug-related suicides in North Carolina
All Asia Tag Team Champions
NWA World Tag Team Champions (Florida version)
IWA World Heavyweight Champions (Australia)
IWA World Tag Team Champions (Australia)